Chaikhana may refer to:
Teahouse
Chaikhana, Iran, a village in East Azerbaijan Province, Iran